James Walter Beckett (5 August 1875 – 19 December 1938) was an Irish politician and building contractor.

Early and personal life
James Beckett was born in Sandymount, Dublin on 5 August 1875. His parents were Frances (née Horner) and James Beckett, builder. This was his father's second marriage, and he was the founder and president of the Dublin Master Builders' Association. Beckett was his parents' eldest son. He had four brothers and four sisters, as well as 4 half siblings from his father's first marriage to Mary Ann Jessie Kennedy.

His brother, George F. Beckett became an architect and building contractor. The family moved to 7 Kildare Street while Beckett's father worked on the construction of National Library and National Museum of Ireland. They later moved to Ely Place. He attended Rathmines School, Dublin. He served an apprenticeship with Patterson & Kempster, quantity surveyors; became head of the family building firm James Beckett Ltd, Ringsend, in 1915; and was later president of the Builders' Federation and the Dublin Master Builders' Association.

In June 1899, he married Elizabeth Ethel Keohler (later spelt Keller); and they had two sons and two daughters. One of their sons was the composer Walter Beckett. He was a relative of Samuel Beckett.

Politics
A personal friend and political supporter of W. T. Cosgrave, Beckett was first elected to Dáil Éireann as a Cumann na nGaedheal Teachta Dála (TD) for the Dublin South constituency at the June 1927 general election. He was re-elected at each general election until he lost his seat at the 1937 general election. He regained his seat at the 1938 general election in June but died in December 1938. The by-election caused by his death was held on 6 June 1939 and was won by John McCann of Fianna Fáil.

References

1875 births
1938 deaths
Cumann na nGaedheal TDs
Fine Gael TDs
Members of the 5th Dáil
Members of the 6th Dáil
Members of the 7th Dáil
Members of the 8th Dáil
Members of the 10th Dáil
Politicians from County Dublin
People educated at Rathmines School
Irish Anglicans